Brent Kolatalo is an American mixer, record producer, engineer and songwriter based in New York City. Kolatalo has worked with numerous artists and musicians, including Kanye West, Jay-Z, Eminem, Drake, Bruno Mars, X Ambassadors, Future, Chris Webby, Ella Henderson, Taylor Swift, Lorde, OneRepublic, Lady Gaga and Lana Del Rey among others.

He has worked on several albums such as, To Pimp a Butterfly, Uptown Special, If You're Reading This it's too Late, Based On a T.R.U. Story, My Beautiful Dark Twisted Fantasy, Watch the Throne, Just Charlie, Late Registration and The College Dropout among others.

Life and career 
Kolatalo was born in Barberton and grew up in Cincinnati, Ohio. He began practicing guitar when he was a kid, one of his tutors was Jeff Martin.

He attended Lakota West High School in West Chester, Ohio and graduated in 2000. In 2002, he went to Berklee College of Music in Boston, during summers he was a trainee at Avatar studios. Kolatalo dropped out in 2004 after working on Kanye West debut studio album, The College Dropout which earning several nominations at the 47th Grammy Awards.

In 2007, Kolatalo started The Skywalkers, a production team with his partner Ken Lewis which has been renamed, Katalyst in 2011.

Kolatalo's songwriting credits include "The Blacker the Berry", Kendrick Lamar's track, which appeared on his album To Pimp a Butterfly (2015). He is the engineer on multi-platinum Mark Ronson's single featuring Bruno Mars, "Uptown Funk". In 2016, Kolatalo recorded and played on the track "Come to Mama" from Lady Gaga's album, Joanne. In 2019, he has worked on Taylor Swift's album, Lover.

Awards and recognition 
He is a three-time Grammy nominee by name and has worked on over sixteen Grammy nominated albums. Having nominated for his work as audio and mixer engineer on works such as Kendrick Lamar’s To Pimp a Butterfly (2015), Eminem‘s Eminem (Recovery) (2010) and Kanye West’s The College Dropout (2004).

Grammy awards

Discography 

 2020: Ella Henderson, Take Care of You — Producer
 2020: Eminem, Music to Be Murdered By: Side B — Recording
 2019: Rick Ross, Port of Miami 2 — Bass, Composer, Drums, Keyboards
 2019: Taylor Swift, Lover — Engineer
 2018: Des Rocs, Let The Vultures In — Producer, Mixing
 2017: Belly, Mumble Rap — Composer
 2017: The Marias, Superclean Vol. I. — Mixing
 2017: K. Michelle, Kimberly: People I Used to Know — Composer
 2017:The Score, ATLAS — Composer
 2017: Lorde, Melodrama — Drum Programming
 2016: One Republic, Oh My My — Additional Production, Drums, Keys, Guitars
 2016: V. Rose, Young Dangerous Heart  — Mixing
 2016: The Score, Unstoppable — Composer
 2016: Farid Bang, Blut — Mixing
 2016: Bruno Mars, 24k Magic — Engineer
 2016: Lady Gaga, Joanne — Drums, Engineer
 2015: Kendrick Lamar, To Pimp a Butterfly — Composer
 2015: X Ambassadors, VHS (Deluxe) — Producer
 2015: Drake, If You're Reading This it's too Late — Composer
 2015: Gallant, Red Bull Single for "Borderline"  — Mixing
 2015: Jamie Foxx, Hollywood: A Story of a Dozen Roses — Composer
 2014: Future, Honest — Producer
 2014: Chris Webby, Chemically Imbalanced — Additional Production, Mixing
 2014: TyDi, Redefined — Mixing
 2014: Niykee Heaton, Bad Intentions — Sample Recreation
 2013: Kanye West, Yeezus — Engineer
 2013: Eminem, The Marshall Mathers LP 2 — Digital Editing
 2013: Pusha T, My Name Is My Name — Composer
 2013: Jay-Z, Magna Carta... Holy Grail — Sampling
 2013: John Legend, Love in the Future — Engineer
 2013: Big Sean, Hall of Fame — Musician
 2013: J. Cole , Born Sinner — Engineer
 2012: Timeflies, One Night Ep — Mixing
 2012: Bruno Mars, Unorthodox Jukebox — Drum Engineering
 2012: Lana Del Rey, Born to Die — Drums, Engineer
 2012: 2 Chainz, Based on a T.R.U. Story — Bass Programming, Drum Programming
 2011:Jay-Z / Kanye West, Watch the Throne — Bass, Engineer, Guitar, Keyboards
 2011: Drake, Take Care — Engineer, Instrumentation
 2011: Maybach Music Group Presents: Self Made, Vol. 1 — Keyboards
 2010: The Knocks, Magic — Mixing
 2010: Rick Ross, Teflon Don — Instrumentation
 2010: Charlie Wilson, Just Charlie — Musician Engineer
 2010: Eminem, Recovery — Musician, Engineer
 2010: Kanye West, My Beautiful Dark Twisted Fantasy — Drum Programming, Engineer, Keyboards
 2010: Kid Cudi, Man on the Moon II: The Legend of Mr. Rager — Engineer
 2010: Rain, Back to The Basic — Mixing
 2009: Mario, D.N.A. — Drum Programming
 2009: SS501, Rebirth — Mixing
 2008: Miggs, Unraveled — Mixing
 2008: Cristian Alexanda, Too Fine — Mixing
 2008: Balance, Golden State Warriorz Comp, Vol. 1 — Mixing
 2008: Kanye West, 808's & Heartbreak — Musician
 2008: San Quinn, From a Boy to a Man — Mixing
 2007: E.P., Supastar — Mixing
 2007: Skidmore Fountain, Break  — Mixing
 2006: Skidmore Fountain, Skidmore Fountain — Mixing
 2006: D&A, Love Goes — Mixing
 2006: Ghostface Killah, Fishscale — Musician
 2005: Cuban Link, Chain Reaction — Engineer
 2005: Common, Be — Musician
 2005 : Memphis Bleek, 543 — Musician
 2005: Cassidy, I'm a Hustla — Sample Recreation
 2004: Jin, The Rest Is History —Engineer, Musician
 2004: Kanye West, The College Dropout — Engineer
 2004: Man on Earth, Disposable Sounds for the Fickle Mind — Engineer
 2004: Jadakiss, Kiss of Death — Musician

References

External links 

 Official website
 
 

Living people
Mastering engineers
American audio engineers
Berklee College of Music alumni
Year of birth missing (living people)